Roger Waters: The Wall is a live album by Roger Waters, a former member of Pink Floyd. It is a live recording of Pink Floyd's 1979 rock opera The Wall.

Track listing
The album was released in a 2-CD format, as well as a 3-LP format. All lyrics by Roger Waters.

2-CD Version

3-LP Version
 Disc one

 Disc two

 Disc three

Personnel 
 Roger Waters : Vocals, guitar, bass, trumpet on "Outside the Wall" 
G. E. Smith : Guitar, bass 
 Snowy White : Guitar
 David Kilminster : Guitar, bass on "Mother"
 Robbie Wyckoff : Vocals
 Jon Carin : Keyboards, guitar
 Harry Waters : Piano, harmonium
 Graham Broad : Drums
 Jon Joyce, Kipp Lennon, Mark Lennon, Pat Lennon : Backing vocals

Sources
 The Spotify page for the album
 The Discogs page containing the track listing for the 3-LP version
 Personnel : https://www.discogs.com/Roger-Waters-The-Wall/release/7717250

Roger Waters live albums
2015 live albums
Columbia Records live albums
The Wall (rock opera)
Albums produced by Nigel Godrich